Anne-Marie Kantengwa was born in 1953 in Jabana, near Kigali, Rwanda. She is a businesswoman and a former Rwandan Patriotic Front (FPR) deputy in the Parliament of Rwanda.

Early life 
Anne Marie Kantengwa is a  Rwandan genocide survivor in 1994, she lost her parents, husband, relatives and children.

References

1953 births
Living people
People from Kigali
Members of the Chamber of Deputies (Rwanda)
21st-century Rwandan women politicians
21st-century Rwandan politicians